is a side-scrolling hack and slash video game produced by Sega, originally released for arcades on the Sega System 16 board in 1987. The player controls ninja Joe Musashi, to stop the Zeed terrorist organization from kidnapping students of his clan.

Shinobi was a commercial success in arcades; it topped the monthly Japanese table arcade charts in December 1987, and became a blockbuster arcade hit in the United States, where it was the highest-grossing conversion kit of 1988 and one of the top five conversion kits of 1989. It was adapted by Sega to its Master System game console, followed by conversions to the Nintendo Entertainment System, PC Engine, and home computers. It was re-released as downloadable emulated versions of the original arcade game for the Wii and Xbox 360. The arcade game joined the Nintendo Switch in January 2020 through the Sega Ages series. Shinobis success inspired various sequels and spin-offs of the Shinobi series.

Gameplay

The controls of Shinobi consist of an eight-way joystick and three action buttons for attacking, jumping, and using ninjutsu techniques called "ninja magic". The player can walk, or perform a crouching walk by pressing the joystick diagonally downward. The player can jump to higher or lower floors by pressing the jump button while holding the joystick up or down. The protagonist Joe Musashi's standard weapons are an unlimited supply of shurikens, and punches and kicks. Rescuing certain hostages in each stage will grant him an attack upgrade replacing throwing stars with a gun, and his close-range attack becomes a katana slash. Musashi's ninjutsu techniques can only be used once per stage and will clear the screen of all enemies, or greatly damage a boss. Depending on the stage, the three ninjutsu techniques are a thunderstorm, a tornado, and a doppelganger attack.

Enemies include punks, mercenaries, ninjas, and the Mongolian swordsmen guarding each hostage. Musashi can bump into most enemies without harm and can only be killed if he gets struck by an enemy's attack, gets hit by a projectile, or falls into a bottomless hole. Then, the stage restarts but retains any saved hostages. When the player runs out of lives, additional coins will continue the game except the final mission. The time limit is three minutes per stage and bonus points are awarded for time, with additional bonuses for refraining from ninjutsu technique (except on the fifth level) or using only melee attacks. Extra lives are awarded for achieving certain scores, completing the bonus round, or rescuing a special hostage.

A bonus round has a first-person perspective of throwing shurikens at incoming enemy ninjas, for an extra life.

Plot 
A ninja named Joe Musashi must stop a criminal organization called Zeed from kidnapping the children of his ninja clan. Five missions consist of three stages in the first mission and four stages each in the rest, where Musashi approaches Zeed's headquarters and frees all the hostages in the first two or three stages with a boss at the final stage of each mission. At the start of each mission, the player is shown the objective, with a file containing a photograph of the enemy boss and a map display pinpointing the location of the next stage.

Ports

Master System
Sega converted Shinobi to its Master System game console. It was released in Japan on June 19, 1988, and in North America and Europe. Some of the play mechanics were altered. Instead of one-hit kills, the player now has a health gauge before losing a life. Hostage rescue is now an optional task but provides upgrades to the close and long-range weapons, and restores or expands the health gauge. Rescuing certain hostages is a requirement to access the game's bonus stages, which now occur after the regular stages instead of each boss fight. Bonus rounds provide the ninjutsu skills.

In October 1993, Atari Corporation filed a lawsuit against Sega for an alleged infringement of a patent originally created by Atari Corp. in the 1980s, and Atari sought a preliminary injunction to stop manufacturing, usage, and sales of hardware and software for the Genesis and Game Gear. On September 28, 1994, both parties reached a settlement involving a cross-licensing agreement to publish up to five games each year across their systems until 2001. The Master System version is one of the first five games approved from the deal by Sega in order to be converted for the Atari Jaguar, but it was never released.

Home computers
In 1989, conversions of Shinobi were released for the Amiga, Atari ST, Commodore 64, Amstrad CPC, and ZX Spectrum. All five were developed by The Sales Curve and published by Virgin Mastertronic in Europe and by Sega in North America except the Amstrad and Spectrum versions. An IBM PC version was developed by Micromosaics Inc. and released in North America by Sega.

PC Engine
A PC Engine version was released exclusively in Japan by Asmik on December 8, 1989. The graphics and play mechanics of the PC Engine version are similar to the arcade version's, but the close-range attacks and power-ups are missing and there are extra lives for points instead of bonus rounds. There is no life gauge, time limit, or Mission 2.

Nintendo Entertainment System
The Nintendo Entertainment System version of Shinobi was released by Tengen exclusively in North America as an unlicensed release in 1989. The play mechanics are based on the Master System's version, but without close-range weapons and grenades. All the vertical-scrolling stages (such as Mission 2-2 and Mission 3-2) were redesigned into horizontal-scrolling stages.

Wii and Xbox 360
The arcade version was published on the Wii's Virtual Console and Xbox 360's Live Arcade services, with slight graphical modifications due to licensing issues over one character's resemblance to Spider-Man.

Sonic's Ultimate Genesis Collection
Shinobi is unlockable in Sonic's Ultimate Genesis Collection for the PlayStation 3 and Xbox 360 after the first round of Shinobi III: Return of the Ninja Master without using a continue.

Reception

In Japan, Game Machine listed Shinobi in its December 15, 1987, issue as the most successful table arcade unit of the month. In the United States, Shinobi became a blockbuster hit. It became America's highest-grossing arcade conversion kit of 1988, and again one of America's top five highest-grossing conversion kits of 1989.

The arcade game received critical acclaim. Clare Edgeley of Computer and Video Games noted it as one of several popular "martial arts simulation" games at London's Amusement Trades Exhibition International (ATEI) show in January 1988, along with Taito's Ninja Warriors and Data East's Vigilante; she said it plays similarly to Ninja Warriors, but that Shinobi also has elements from Namco's run and gun video game Rolling Thunder (1986), introduces bonus stages, and is more challenging overall. She praised the "clean colourful graphics" with large "well defined" sprites, and the action gameplay for being fast-paced and challenging, concluding that the game is "well worth playing". Nick Kelly of Commodore User rated it 8 out of 10, also noting similarities to Rolling Thunder but said Shinobi looks good, "plays brilliantly", and "combines several kinds of shoot'em and beat'em up action in one well-thought-out, well-executed game." Sinclair User also compared it to Rolling Thunder and other martial arts games, but considers Shinobi "sufficiently different to be familiar without being boring." Retrospectively, Black Belt magazine in 2003 called Shinobi "one of the best martial arts arcade games of the 1980s".

Sega's conversion for the Master System received critical acclaim. Computer and Video Games praised the "well defined" graphics, good sound, and "excellent" gameplay. It was awarded 4 out of 5 stars in Dragon. Classic Game Room's retrospective review reflected that the game is a classic, though less so than the 16-bit sequel The Revenge of Shinobi.

Zach Gass of Screen Rant included Shinobi and its sequels in his list of ten "awesome" hack-and-slash games in 2020.

Legacy
According to Den of Geek, "Shinobi is arguably the most ‘important’ and influential ninja game, as well as kicking off the genre’s longest running franchise."

Sequels and related games

In 1989, Sega released a sequel called The Revenge of Shinobi (The Super Shinobi in Japan) as one of the first games for its new Mega Drive game console. An arcade sequel called Shadow Dancer was also released in 1989. Shadow Dancer retains the original gameplay, adding a canine companion.

Other sequels were released for the Game Gear, Mega Drive/Genesis, Sega Saturn, the PlayStation 2, and the Nintendo 3DS. Alex Kidd in Shinobi World is a parody of Shinobi starring former Sega mascot Alex Kidd, released for the Master System in 1990.

References

External links

Official website 

1987 video games
Amiga games
Amstrad CPC games
Arcade video games
Atari ST games
Cancelled Atari Jaguar games
Commodore 64 games
IOS games
Master System games
MSX games
Nintendo Entertainment System games
Nintendo Switch games
Platform games
PlayStation 3 games
Sega arcade games
Shinobi (series)
Tengen (company) games
Unauthorized video games
Tiger Electronics handheld games
TurboGrafx-16 games
Video games developed in Japan
Video games scored by Yasuhiro Kawakami
Virtual Console games
Xbox 360 Live Arcade games
ZX Spectrum games
Multiplayer and single-player video games